Caryophyllales is an order of flowering plants that includes the cacti, carnations, amaranths, ice plants, beets, and many carnivorous plants. Many members are succulent, having fleshy stems or leaves.
This order is part of the core eudicots.  The monophyly of the Caryophyllales has been supported by DNA sequences, cytochrome c sequence data and heritable characters such as anther wall development and vessel-elements with simple perforations.

The anthophytes are a grouping of plant taxa bearing flower-like reproductive structures. They were formerly thought to be a clade comprising plants bearing flower-like structures.  The group contained the angiosperms - the extant flowering plants, such as roses and grasses - as well as the Gnetales and the extinct Bennettitales.

23,420 species of vascular plant have been recorded in South Africa, making it the sixth most species-rich country in the world and the most species-rich country on the African continent. Of these, 153 species are considered to be threatened. Nine biomes have been described in South Africa: Fynbos, Succulent Karoo, desert, Nama Karoo, grassland, savanna, Albany thickets, the Indian Ocean coastal belt, and forests.

The 2018 South African National Biodiversity Institute's National Biodiversity Assessment plant checklist lists 35,130 taxa in the phyla Anthocerotophyta (hornworts (6)), Anthophyta (flowering plants (33534)), Bryophyta (mosses (685)), Cycadophyta (cycads (42)), Lycopodiophyta (Lycophytes(45)), Marchantiophyta (liverworts (376)), Pinophyta (conifers (33)), and Pteridophyta (cryptogams (408)).

21 families are represented in the literature. Listed taxa include species, subspecies, varieties, and forms as recorded, some of which have subsequently been allocated to other taxa as synonyms, in which cases the accepted taxon is appended to the listing. Multiple entries under alternative names reflect taxonomic revision over time.

Aizoaceae

Family Aizoaceae, 169 genera have been recorded. Not all are necessarily currently accepted.
 
 Genus Acrodon:
 Genus Acrosanthes:
 Genus Aethephyllum:
 Genus Aizoanthemum:
 Genus Aizoon:
 Genus Aloinopsis:
 Genus Amoebophyllum:
 Genus Amphibolia:
 Genus Antegibbaeum:
 Genus Antimima:
 Genus Anysocalyx:
 Genus Apatesia:
 Genus Aptenia:
 Genus Arenifera:
 Genus Argeta:
 Genus Argyroderma:
 Genus Aridaria:
 Genus Aspazoma:
 Genus Astridia:
 Genus Bergeranthus:
 Genus Bijlia:
 Genus Braunsia:
 Genus Brianhuntleya:
 Genus Brownanthus:
 Genus Calamophyllum:
 Genus Callistigma:
 Genus Carpanthea:
 Genus Carpobrotus:
 Genus Carruanthus:
 Genus Caryotophora:
 Genus Caulipsolon:
 Genus Cephalophyllum:
 Genus Cerochlamys:
 Genus Chasmatophyllum:
 Genus Cheiridopsis:
 Genus Circandra:
 Genus Cleretum:
 Genus Conicosia:
 Genus Conophyllum:
 Genus Conophytum:
 Genus Corpuscularia:
 Genus Cryophytum:
 Genus Cylindrophyllum:
 Genus Dactylopsis:
 Genus Deilanthe:
 Genus Delosperma:
 Genus Dicrocaulon:
 Genus Didymaotus:
 Genus Dinteranthus:
 Genus Diplosoma:
 Genus Disphyma:
 Genus Dorotheanthus:
 Genus Dracophilus:
 Genus Drosanthemopsis:
 Genus Drosanthemum:
 Genus Eberlanzia:
 Genus Ebracteola:
 Genus Ectotropis:
 Genus Enarganthe:
 Genus Erepsia:
 Genus Esterhuysenia:
 Genus Eurystigma:
 Genus Faucaria:
 Genus Frithia:
 Genus Galenia:
 Genus Gasoul:
 Genus Gibbaeum:
 Genus Glottiphyllum:
 Genus Halenbergia:
 Genus Hammeria:
 Genus Hartmanthus:
 Genus Hereroa:
 Genus Herrea:
 Genus Herreanthus:
 Genus Hydrodea:
 Genus Hymenogyne:
 Genus Ihlenfeldtia:
 Genus Imitaria:
 Genus Jacobsenia:
 Genus Jensenobotrya:
 Genus Jordaaniella:
 Genus Juttadinteria:
 Genus Kensitia:
 Genus Khadia:
 Genus Lampranthus:
 Genus Lapidaria:
 Genus Leipoldtia:
 Genus Lithops:
 Genus Litocarpus:
 Genus Machairophyllum:
 Genus Malephora:
 Genus Marlothistella:
 Genus Maughaniella:
 Genus Mentocalyx:
 Genus Mesembryanthemum:
 Genus Mestoklema:
 Genus Meyerophytum:
 Genus Micropterum:
 Genus Mitrophyllum:
 Genus Monilaria:
 Genus Mossia:
 Genus Muiria:
 Genus Namaquanthus:
 Genus Nananthus:
 Genus Nelia:
 Genus Neohenricia:
 Genus Nycteranthus:
 Genus Octopoma:
 Genus Odontophorus:
 Genus Oophytum:
 Genus Ophthalmophyllum:
 Genus Opophytum:
 Genus Orthopterum:
 Genus Oscularia:
 Genus Ottosonderia:
 Genus Peersia:
 Genus Pentacoilanthus:
 Genus Perapentacoilanthus:
 Genus Peratetracoilanthus:
 Genus Phiambolia:
 Genus Phyllobolus:
 Genus Platythyra:
 Genus Pleiospilos:
 Genus Plinthus:
 Genus Polymita:
 Genus Prenia:
 Genus Prepodesma:
 Genus Psammophora:
 Genus Pseudobrownanthus:
 Genus Psilocaulon:
 Genus Pteropentacoilanthus:
 Genus Rabiea:
 Genus Rhinephyllum:
 Genus Rhombophyllum:
 Genus Roosia:
 Genus Ruschia:
 Genus Ruschianthemum:
 Genus Ruschiella:
 Genus Saphesia:
 Genus Schlechteranthus:
 Genus Schwantesia:
 Genus Scopelogena :
 Genus Semnanthe:
 Genus Sesuvium:
 Genus Sineoperculum:
 Genus Skiatophytum:
 Genus Smicrostigma:
 Genus Sphalmanthus:
 Genus Stayneria:
 Genus Stoeberia:
 Genus Stomatium:
 Genus Synaptophyllum:
 Genus Tanquana:
 Genus Tetracoilanthus:
 Genus Tetragonia:
 Genus Titanopsis:
 Genus Trianthema:
 Genus Tribulocarpus:
 Genus Trichocyclus:
 Genus Trichodiadema:
 Genus Vanheerdea:
 Genus Vanzijlia:
 Genus Vlokia:
 Genus Volkeranthus:
 Genus Wooleya:
 Genus Zaleya:
 Genus Zeuktophyllum:

Amaranthaceae
Family: Amaranthaceae,

Achyranthes
Genus Achyranthes:
 Achyranthes aspera L. not indigenous
 Achyranthes aspera L. var. aspera, not indigenous
 Achyranthes aspera L. var. pubescens (Moq.) C.C.Towns. not indigenous
 Achyranthes aspera L. var. sicula L. not indigenous

Achyropsis
Genus Achyropsis:
 Achyropsis avicularis (E.Mey. ex Moq.) T.Cooke & C.H.Wright, endemic
 Achyropsis leptostachya (E.Mey. ex Meisn.) Baker & C.B.Clarke, indigenous

Aerva
Genus Aerva:
 Aerva lanata (L.) Juss. ex Schult. indigenous
 Aerva leucura Moq. indigenous

Alternanthera
Genus Alternanthera:
 Alternanthera caracasana Kunth, not indigenous
 Alternanthera nodiflora R.Br. accepted as Alternanthera sessilis (L.) DC. not indigenous
 Alternanthera pungens Kunth, not indigenous
 Alternanthera sessilis (L.) DC. not indigenous, invasive

Amaranthus
Genus Amaranthus:
 Amaranthus blitoides S.Watson, not indigenous
 Amaranthus capensis Thell. indigenous
 Amaranthus capensis Thell. subsp. capensis, endemic
 Amaranthus capensis Thell. subsp. uncinatus (Thell.) Brenan, endemic
 Amaranthus deflexus L. not indigenous
 Amaranthus dinteri Schinz, indigenous
 Amaranthus dinteri Schinz subsp. brevipetiolatus Brenan, endemic
 Amaranthus dinteri Schinz subsp. dinterivar. a, indigenous
 Amaranthus dinteri Schinz subsp. dinterivar. b, indigenous
 Amaranthus dubius Mart. ex Thell. not indigenous
 Amaranthus graecizans L. subsp. graecizans, not indigenous
 Amaranthus hybridus L. subsp. hybridus var. hybridus, not indigenous
 Amaranthus hybridus L. subsp. cruentus(L.) Thell. not indigenous
 Amaranthus hybridus L. subsp. hybridus var. erythrostachys, not indigenous
 Amaranthus lividus L. subsp. polygonoides (Moq.) Probst, not indigenous
 Amaranthus muricatus (Moq.) Hieron. not indigenous
 Amaranthus praetermissus Brenan, indigenous
 Amaranthus retroflexus L. var. retroflexus, not indigenous
 Amaranthus retroflexus L. var. delilei (Richt. & Loret) Thell. not indigenous
 Amaranthus schinzianus Thell. indigenous
 Amaranthus spinosus L. not indigenous
 Amaranthus standleyanus Parodi ex Covas, not indigenous
 Amaranthus thunbergii Moq. indigenous
 Amaranthus viridis L. not indigenous

Arthrocnemum
Formerly accepted genus Arthrocnemum:
 Arthrocnemum indicum (Willd.) Moq., accepted as Tecticornia indica (Willd.) K.A.Sheph. & Paul G.Wilson, indigenous
 Arthrocnemum perenne (Mill.) Moss ex Fourc., accepted as Salicornia perennis Mill.

Atriplex
Genus Atriplex:
 Atriplex cinerea Poir. indigenous
 Atriplex cinerea Poir. subsp. bolusii (C.H.Wright) Aellen var. adamsonii, indigenous
 Atriplex cinerea Poir. subsp. bolusii (C.H.Wright) Aellen var. genuina, not indigenous
 Atriplex eardleyae Aellen, not indigenous
 Atriplex erosa G.Bruckn. & I.Verd. endemic
 Atriplex hortensis L. not indigenous
 Atriplex inflata F.Muell. accepted as Atriplex lindleyi Moq. subsp. inflata (F.Muell.) Paul G.Wilson, not indigenous, invasive
 Atriplex lindleyi Moq. subsp. inflata (F.Muell.) Paul G.Wilson, not indigenous, invasive
 Atriplex lindleyi Moq. subsp. quadripartita Paul G.Wilson, not indigenous
 Atriplex littoralis L. not indigenous
 Atriplex muelleri Benth. not indigenous
 Atriplex nitens Schkuhr, not indigenous
 Atriplex nummularia Lindl. accepted as Atriplex nummularia Lindl. subsp. nummularia, not indigenous
 Atriplex nummularia Lindl. subsp. nummularia, not indigenous, invasive
 Atriplex patula L. indigenous
 Atriplex patula L. subsp. austro-africana Aellen, indigenous
 Atriplex patula L. subsp. verreauxii Aellen, not indigenous
 Atriplex rosea L. not indigenous
 Atriplex semibaccata R.Br. not indigenous, invasive
 Atriplex spongiosa F.Muell. not indigenous
 Atriplex suberecta I.Verd. indigenous
 Atriplex vestita (Thunb.) Aellen, indigenous
 Atriplex vestita (Thunb.) Aellen var. appendiculata Aellen, indigenous
 Atriplex vestita (Thunb.) Aellen var. inappendiculata Aellen, endemic

Bassia
Genus Bassia:
 Bassia diffusa (Thunb.) Kuntze, accepted as Chenolea diffusa Thunb. indigenous
 Bassia dinteri (Botsch.) A.J.Scott, indigenous
 Bassia indica (Wight) A.J.Scott, not indigenous
 Bassia salsoloides (Fenzl) A.J.Scott, indigenous

Beta
Genus Beta:
 Beta vulgaris L. subsp. vulgaris, not indigenous

Calicorema
Genus Calicorema:
 Calicorema capitata (Moq.) Hook.f. indigenous
 Calicorema squarrosa (Schinz) Schinz, indigenous

Celosia
Genus Celosia:
 Celosia argentea L. forma argentea, not indigenous
 Celosia nervosa C.C.Towns. endemic
 Celosia trigyna L. indigenous

Centema
Genus Centema:
 Centema subfusca (Moq.) T.Cooke, indigenous

Chenolea
Genus Chenolea:
 Chenolea convallis Snijman & J.C.Manning, endemic
 Chenolea diffusa Thunb. indigenous
 Chenolea dinteri Botsch. accepted as Bassia dinteri (Botsch.) A.J.Scott, indigenous

Chenoleoides
Genus Chenoleoides:
 Chenoleoides dinteri (Botsch.) Botsch. accepted as Bassia dinteri (Botsch.) A.J.Scott, indigenous

Chenopodium
Genus Chenopodium:
 Chenopodium album L. not indigenous
 Chenopodium ambrosioides L. accepted as Dysphania ambrosioides (L.) Mosyakin, not indigenous
 Chenopodium botryodes Sm. not indigenous
 Chenopodium carinatum R.Br. not indigenous
 Chenopodium cristatum (F.Muell.) F.Muell. accepted as Dysphania cristata (F.Muell.) Mosyakin, not indigenous
 Chenopodium foliosum Asch. not indigenous
 Chenopodium giganteum D.Don, not indigenous
 Chenopodium glaucum L. not indigenous
 Chenopodium hederiforme (Murr) Aellen, indigenous
 Chenopodium hederiforme (Murr) Aellen var. dentatum Aellen, indigenous
 Chenopodium hederiforme (Murr) Aellen var. undulatum Aellen, indigenous
 Chenopodium hircinum Schrad. not indigenous
 Chenopodium mucronatum Thunb. indigenous
 Chenopodium multifidum L. accepted as Dysphania multifida (L.) Mosyakin & Clemants, not indigenous
 Chenopodium murale L. var. murale, not indigenous
 Chenopodium olukondae (Murr) Murr, indigenous
 Chenopodium opulifolium Schrad. ex W.D.J.Koch & Ziz var. opulifolium, not indigenous
 Chenopodium petiolariforme (Aellen) Aellen, indigenous
 Chenopodium phillipsianum Aellen, not indigenous
 Chenopodium polyspermum L. not indigenous
 Chenopodium pumilio R.Br. not indigenous
 Chenopodium schraderianum Roem. & Schult. not indigenous
 Chenopodium sericeum (Aiton) Spreng. accepted as Chenolea diffusa Thunb. indigenous
 Chenopodium stellulatum (Benth.) Aellen, not indigenous
 Chenopodium x bontei Aellen, not indigenous

Cyathula
Genus Cyathula:
 Cyathula cylindrica Moq. indigenous
 Cyathula cylindrica Moq. var. cylindrica, indigenous
 Cyathula lanceolata Schinz, indigenous
 Cyathula natalensis Sond. indigenous
 Cyathula orthacantha (Hochst. ex Asch.) Schinz, indigenous
 Cyathula uncinulata (Schrad.) Schinz, indigenous

Dysphania
Genus Dysphania:
 Dysphania ambrosioides (L.) Mosyakin, not indigenous, invasive
 Dysphania cristata (F.Muell.) Mosyakin, not indigenous, invasive
 Dysphania multifida (L.) Mosyakin & Clemants, not indigenous, invasive

Echinopsilon
Genus Echinopsilon:
 Echinopsilon diffusum (Hornst.) Moq. accepted as Chenolea diffusa Thunb. indigenous
 Echinopsilon sericeum (Aiton) Moq. accepted as Chenolea diffusa Thunb. indigenous

Einadia
Genus Einadia:
 Einadia nutans (R.Br.) A.J.Scott subsp. nutans, not indigenous

Exomis
Genus Exomis:
 Exomis microphylla (Thunb.) Aellen, indigenous
 Exomis microphylla (Thunb.) Aellen var. axyrioides (Fenzl) Aellen, endemic

Gomphrena
Genus Gomphrena:
 Gomphrena celosioides Mart. not indigenous
 Gomphrena globosa L. not indigenous

Guilleminea
Genus Guilleminea:
 Guilleminea densa (Willd. ex Roem. & Schult.) Moq. not indigenous

Halopeplis
Genus Halopeplis:
 Halopeplis amplexicaulis (Vahl) Ung.-Sternb. ex Ces. Pass. & Gibelli, not indigenous

Halosarcia
Genus Halosarcia:
 Halosarcia indica (Willd.) Paul G.Wilson, accepted as Tecticornia indica (Willd.) K.A.Sheph. & Paul G.Wilson, indigenous

Hermbstaedtia
Genus Hermbstaedtia:
 Hermbstaedtia caffra (Meisn.) Moq. endemic
 Hermbstaedtia capitata Schinz, endemic
 Hermbstaedtia fleckii (Schinz) Baker & C.B.Clarke, indigenous
 Hermbstaedtia glauca (J.C.Wendl.) Rchb. ex Steud. indigenous
 Hermbstaedtia odorata (Burch.) T.Cooke, indigenous
 Hermbstaedtia odorata (Burch.) T.Cooke var. albi-rosea Suess. indigenous
 Hermbstaedtia odorata (Burch.) T.Cooke var. aurantiaca (Suess.) C.C.Towns. indigenous
 Hermbstaedtia odorata (Burch.) T.Cooke var. odorata, indigenous
 Hermbstaedtia rogersii Burtt Davy, endemic
 Hermbstaedtia schaeferi (Schinz) Schinz & Dinter, indigenous

Kochia
Genus Kochia:
 Kochia ciliata F.Muell. not indigenous
 Kochia indica Wight, accepted as Bassia indica (Wight) A.J.Scott, unconfirmed
 Kochia salsoloides Fenzl, accepted as Bassia salsoloides (Fenzl) A.J.Scott, indigenous
 Kochia sericea (Aiton) Schrad. accepted as Chenolea diffusa Thunb. indigenous
 Kochia tomentosa (Moq.) F.Muell. not indigenous
 Kochia tomentosa (Moq.) F.Muell. var. tenuifolia F.Muell. not indigenous
 Kochia tricophylla Stapf, not indigenous

Kyphocarpa
Genus Kyphocarpa:
 Kyphocarpa angustifolia (Moq.) Lopr. indigenous
 Kyphocarpa cruciata (Schinz) Schinz, indigenous
 Kyphocarpa trichinoides (Fenzl) Lopr. endemic

Leucosphaera
Genus Leucosphaera:
 Leucosphaera bainesii (Hook.f.) Gilg, indigenous

Manochlamys
Genus Manochlamys:
 Manochlamys albicans (Aiton) Aellen, indigenous

Nothosaerva
Genus Nothosaerva:
 Nothosaerva brachiata (L.) Wight, indigenous

Psilotrichum
Genus Psilotrichum:
 Psilotrichum scleranthum Thwaites, indigenous

Pupalia
Genus Pupalia:
 Pupalia lappacea (L.) A.Juss. indigenous
 Pupalia lappacea (L.) A.Juss. var. lappacea, indigenous

Salicornia
Genus Salicornia:
 Salicornia indica Willd., accepted as Tecticornia indica (Willd.) K.A.Sheph. & Paul G.Wilson, indigenous
 Salicornia meyeriana Moss, indigenous
 Salicornia pachystachya Bunge ex Ung.-Sternb. indigenous
 Salicornia perrieri A.Chev. indigenous
 Salicornia radicans Sm., accepted as Salicornia perennis Mill., present
 Salicornia uniflora Toelken, indigenous

Salsola
Genus Salsola:
 Salsola acocksii Botsch. indigenous
 Salsola adisca Botsch. endemic
 Salsola adversariifolia Botsch. endemic
 Salsola aellenii Botsch. endemic
 Salsola albida Botsch. indigenous
 Salsola angolensis Botsch. indigenous
 Salsola aphylla L.f. indigenous
 Salsola apiciflora Botsch. endemic
 Salsola apterygea Botsch. endemic
 Salsola araneosa Botsch. indigenous
 Salsola arborea C.A.Sm. ex Aellen, indigenous
 Salsola armata C.A.Sm. ex Aellen, indigenous
 Salsola atrata Botsch. endemic
 Salsola australis R.Br. accepted as Salsola kali L. not indigenous
 Salsola barbata Aellen, indigenous
 Salsola calluna Fenzl ex C.H.Wright, endemic
 Salsola capensis Botsch. endemic
 Salsola ceresica Botsch. endemic
 Salsola columnaris Botsch. indigenous
 Salsola contrariifolia Botsch. indigenous
 Salsola cryptoptera Aellen, indigenous
 Salsola dealata Botsch. endemic
 Salsola decussata C.A.Sm. ex Botsch. endemic
 Salsola denudata Botsch. indigenous
 Salsola diffusa (Hornst.) Thunb. accepted as Chenolea diffusa Thunb. indigenous
 Salsola esterhuyseniae Botsch. endemic
 Salsola exalata Botsch. endemic
 Salsola geminiflora Fenzl ex C.H.Wright, endemic
 Salsola gemmifera Botsch. indigenous
 Salsola gemmipara Botsch. indigenous
 Salsola glabrescens Burtt Davy, indigenous
 Salsola henriciae I.Verd. endemic
 Salsola humifusa A.Bruckn. indigenous
 Salsola inaperta Botsch. indigenous
 Salsola kalaharica Botsch. endemic
 Salsola kali L. not indigenous, invasive
 Salsola koichabica Botsch. indigenous
 Salsola marginata Botsch. indigenous
 Salsola melanantha Botsch. indigenous
 Salsola merxmuelleri Aellen, indigenous
 Salsola microtricha Botsch. endemic
 Salsola minutiflora C.A.Sm. ex Ulbr. accepted as Salsola armata C.A.Sm. ex Aellen, present
 Salsola minutifolia Botsch. endemic
 Salsola namaqualandica Botsch. indigenous
 Salsola nollothensis Aellen, indigenous
 Salsola patentipilosa Botsch. endemic
 Salsola phillipsii Botsch. indigenous
 Salsola procera Botsch. indigenous
 Salsola ptiloptera Botsch. indigenous
 Salsola rabieana I.Verd. indigenous
 Salsola robinsonii Botsch. indigenous
 Salsola scopiformis Botsch. indigenous
 Salsola seminuda Botsch. indigenous
 Salsola sericata Botsch. indigenous
 Salsola sericea Aiton, accepted as Chenolea diffusa Thunb. indigenous
 Salsola smithii Botsch. endemic
 Salsola squarrosula Botsch. indigenous
 Salsola tetramera Botsch. endemic
 Salsola tragus L. accepted as Salsola kali L. not indigenous, invasive
 Salsola tuberculata (Moq.) Fenzl, indigenous
 Salsola tuberculatiformis Botsch. indigenous
 Salsola verdoorniae Toelken, endemic
 Salsola zeyheri (Moq.) Bunge, indigenous

Sarcocornia
Genus Sarcocornia:
 Sarcocornia capensis (Moss) A.J.Scott, endemic
 Sarcocornia decumbens (Toelken) A.J.Scott, endemic
 Sarcocornia decussata S.Steffen, Mucina & G.Kadereit, endemic
 Sarcocornia freitagii S.Steffen, Mucina & G.Kadereit, endemic
 Sarcocornia littorea (Moss) A.J.Scott, endemic
 Sarcocornia mossiana (Toelken) A.J.Scott, endemic
 Sarcocornia natalensis (Bunge ex Ung.-Sternb.) A.J.Scott, indigenous
 Sarcocornia natalensis (Bunge ex Ung.-Sternb.) A.J.Scott var. affinis (Moss) O'Call. indigenous
 Sarcocornia natalensis (Bunge ex Ung.-Sternb.) A.J.Scott var. natalensis, indigenous
 Sarcocornia perennis (Mill.) A.J.Scott, accepted as Salicornia perennis, indigenous
 Sarcocornia perennis (Mill.) A.J.Scott var. lignosa (Woods) O'Call. indigenous
 Sarcocornia perennis (Mill.) A.J.Scott var. perennis, indigenous
 Sarcocornia pillansii (Moss) A.J.Scott, indigenous
 Sarcocornia pillansii (Moss) A.J.Scott var. pillansii, indigenous
 Sarcocornia tegetaria S.Steffen, Mucina & G.Kadereit, indigenous
 Sarcocornia terminalis (Toelken) A.J.Scott, endemic
 Sarcocornia xerophila (Toelken) A.J.Scott, endemic

Sericocoma
Genus Sericocoma:
 Sericocoma avolans Fenzl, indigenous
 Sericocoma heterochiton Lopr. indigenous
 Sericocoma pungens Fenzl, indigenous

Sericorema
Genus Sericorema:
 Sericorema remotiflora (Hook.f.) Lopr. indigenous
 Sericorema sericea (Schinz) Lopr. indigenous

Suaeda
Genus Suaeda:
 Suaeda caespitosa Wolley-Dod, indigenous
 Suaeda fruticosa (L.) Forssk. indigenous
 Suaeda inflata Aellen, indigenous
 Suaeda merxmuelleri Aellen, indigenous

Tecticornia
Genus Tecticornia:
 Tecticornia indica (Willd.) K.A.Sheph. & Paul G.Wilson, indigenous

Anacampserotaceae
Family: Anacampserotaceae,

Anacampseros
Genus Anacampseros:
 Anacampseros albidiflora Poelln. endemic
 Anacampseros albissima Marloth, accepted as Avonia albissima (Marloth) G.D.Rowley, present
 Anacampseros arachnoides (Haw.) Sims, endemic
 Anacampseros arachnoides (Haw.) Sims subsp. grandiflora Sond. accepted as Anacampseros rufescens (Haw.) Sweet, present
 Anacampseros baeseckei Dinter, indigenous
 Anacampseros bayeriana S.A.Hammer, indigenous
 Anacampseros buderiana Poelln. accepted as Avonia recurvata (Schonland) G.D.Rowley subsp. buderiana (Poelln.) G.Will. present
 Anacampseros comptonii Pillans, endemic
 Anacampseros decapitata Burgoyne & J.van Thiel, endemic
 Anacampseros filamentosa (Haw.) Sims, indigenous
 Anacampseros filamentosa (Haw.) Sims subsp. filamentosa, endemic
 Anacampseros filamentosa (Haw.) Sims subsp. namaquensis (H.Pearson & Stephens) G.D.Rowley, indigenous
 Anacampseros filamentosa (Haw.) Sims subsp. tomentosa (A.Berger) Gerbaulet, indigenous
 Anacampseros gariepensis (G.Will.) Dreher, indigenous
 Anacampseros herreana Poelln. accepted as Avonia herreana (Poelln.) G.D.Rowley, present
 Anacampseros hillii G.Will. endemic
 Anacampseros karasmontana Dinter ex Poelln. indigenous
 Anacampseros lanceolata (Haw.) Sweet, indigenous
 Anacampseros lanceolata (Haw.) Sweet subsp. lanceolata, endemic
 Anacampseros lanceolata (Haw.) Sweet subsp. nebrownii (Poelln.) Gerbaulet, endemic
 Anacampseros lubbersii Bleck, accepted as Anacampseros subnuda Poelln. subsp. lubbersii (Bleck) Gerbaulet, present
 Anacampseros mallei (G.Will.) G.Will. accepted as Avonia mallei G.Will. present
 Anacampseros marlothii Poelln. endemic
 Anacampseros namaquensis H.Pearson & Stephens, accepted as Anacampseros filamentosa (Haw.) Sims subsp. namaquensis (H.Pearson & Stephens) G.D.Rowley, present
 Anacampseros papyracea E.Mey. ex Fenzl, accepted as Avonia papyracea (E.Mey. ex Fenzl) G.D.Rowley subsp. papyracea, indigenous
 Anacampseros papyracea E.Mey. ex Fenzl subsp. namaensis Gerbaulet, accepted as Avonia papyracea (E.Mey. ex Fenzl) G.D.Rowley subsp. namaensis (Gerbaulet) G.D.Rowley, present
 Anacampseros pisina G.Will. endemic
 Anacampseros prominens G.Will. accepted as Avonia prominens (G.Will.) G.Will. present
 Anacampseros quinaria E.Mey. ex Fenzl, indigenous
 Anacampseros recurvata Schonland, accepted as Avonia recurvata (Schonland) G.D.Rowley
 Anacampseros recurvata Schonland subsp. buderiana (Poelln.) Gerbaulet, accepted as Avonia recurvata (Schonland) G.D.Rowley subsp. buderiana (Poelln.) G.Will. present
 Anacampseros recurvata Schonland subsp. minuta Gerbaulet, accepted as Avonia recurvata (Schonland) G.D.Rowley subsp. minuta (Gerbaulet) G.D.Rowley, present
 Anacampseros retusa Poelln. indigenous
 Anacampseros retusa Poelln. forma parva G.Will. endemic
 Anacampseros retusa Poelln. forma rubra G.Will. endemic
 Anacampseros retusa Poelln. subsp. lanuginosa G.Will. endemic
 Anacampseros retusa Poelln. subsp. retusa var. retusa, indigenous
 Anacampseros rhodesica N.E.Br. accepted as Avonia rhodesica (N.E.Br.) G.D.Rowley, present
 Anacampseros rufescens (Haw.) Sweet, indigenous
 Anacampseros scopata G.Will. endemic
 Anacampseros subnuda Poelln. indigenous
 Anacampseros subnuda Poelln. subsp. lubbersii (Bleck) Gerbaulet, endemic
 Anacampseros subnuda Poelln. subsp. subnuda, indigenous
 Anacampseros telephiastrum DC. endemic
 Anacampseros ustulata E.Mey. ex Fenzl, accepted as Avonia ustulata (E.Mey. ex Fenzl) G.D.Rowley, present
 Anacampseros vanthielii G.Will. endemic

Avonia
Genus Avonia:
 Avonia albissima (Marloth) G.D.Rowley, indigenous
 Avonia gariepensis G.Will. accepted as Anacampseros gariepensis (G.Will.) Dreher, indigenous
 Avonia herreana (Poelln.) G.D.Rowley, endemic
 Avonia mallei G.Will. endemic
 Avonia papyracea (E.Mey. ex Fenzl) G.D.Rowley, indigenous
 Avonia papyracea (E.Mey. ex Fenzl) G.D.Rowley subsp. namaensis (Gerbaulet) G.D.Rowley, indigenous
 Avonia papyracea (E.Mey. ex Fenzl) G.D.Rowley subsp. papyracea, indigenous
 Avonia perplexa G.Will. indigenous
 Avonia prominens (G.Will.) G.Will. endemic
 Avonia quinaria (E.Mey. ex Fenzl) G.D.Rowley, accepted as Anacampseros quinaria E.Mey. ex Fenzl, indigenous
 Avonia quinaria (E.Mey. ex Fenzl) G.D.Rowley subsp. alstonii (Schonland) G.D.Rowley, accepted as Anacampseros quinaria E.Mey. ex Fenzl, indigenous
 Avonia recurvata (Schonland) G.D.Rowley, indigenous
 Avonia recurvata (Schonland) G.D.Rowley subsp. buderiana (Poelln.) G.Will. endemic
 Avonia recurvata (Schonland) G.D.Rowley subsp. minuta (Gerbaulet) G.D.Rowley, endemic
 Avonia recurvata (Schonland) G.D.Rowley subsp. recurvata, endemic
 Avonia rhodesica (N.E.Br.) G.D.Rowley, indigenous
 Avonia ruschii (Dinter & Poelln.) G.D.Rowley, indigenous
 Avonia ustulata (E.Mey. ex Fenzl) G.D.Rowley, endemic
 Avonia variabilis (Poelln.) G.Will. indigenous

Talinum
Genus Talinum:
 Talinum arnotii Hook.f. indigenous
 Talinum caffrum (Thunb.) Eckl. & Zeyh. indigenous
 Talinum crispatulum Dinter & Poelln. indigenous
 Talinum decumbens (Forssk.) Willd. accepted as Corbichonia decumbens (Forssk.) Exell, indigenous
 Talinum paniculatum (Jacq.) Gaertn. not indigenous, cultivated
 Talinum portulacifolium (Forssk.) Asch. ex Schweinf. indigenous
 Talinum tenuissimum Dinter, indigenous

Basellaceae
Family: Basellaceae,
 Anredera cordifolia (Ten.) Steenis, not indigenous, naturalised, invasive
 Basella paniculata Volkens, indigenous

Cactaceae
Family: Cactaceae,

Austrocylindropuntia
Genus Austrocylindropuntia:
 Austrocylindropuntia cylindrica (Juss. ex Lam.) Backeb. not indigenous, naturalised, invasive
 Austrocylindropuntia subulata (Muehlenpf.) Backeb. not indigenous, naturalised
 Austrocylindropuntia subulata (Muehlenpf.) Backeb. subsp. exaltata (A.Berger) D.R.Hunt, accepted as Austrocylindropuntia subulata (Muehlenpf.) Backeb. not indigenous, naturalised, invasive
 Austrocylindropuntia vestita (Salm-Dyck) Backeb. not indigenous, cultivated, naturalised

Cereus
Genus Cereus:
 Cereus hexagonus (L.) Mill. not indigenous, naturalised, invasive
 Cereus hildmannianus K.Schum. not indigenous, naturalised, invasive
 Cereus jamacaru DC. not indigenous, naturalised, invasive
 Cereus jamacaru DC. subsp. jamacaru,  not indigenous, naturalised, invasive

Cylindropuntia
Genus Cylindropuntia:
 Cylindropuntia fulgida (Engelm.) F.M.Knuth, not indigenous, naturalised
 Cylindropuntia fulgida (Engelm.) F.M.Knuth var. fulgida,  not indigenous, naturalised, invasive
 Cylindropuntia fulgida (Engelm.) F.M.Knuth var. mamillata (A.Schott ex Engelm.) Backeb. not indigenous, naturalised, invasive
 Cylindropuntia imbricata (Haw.) F.M.Knuth, not indigenous, naturalised, invasive
 Cylindropuntia leptocaulis (DC.) F.M.Knuth, not indigenous, naturalised, invasive
 Cylindropuntia pallida (Rose) F.M.Knuth, not indigenous, naturalised, invasive
 Cylindropuntia spinosior (Engelm.) F.M.Knuth, not indigenous, naturalised, invasive

Echinocactus
Genus Echinocactus:
 Echinocactus oxygonus Link, accepted as Echinopsis oxygona Link & Otto, cultivated

Echinopsis
Genus Echinopsis:
 Echinopsis oxygona Link & Otto, not indigenous, naturalised
 Echinopsis schickendantzii F.A.C.Weber, not indigenous, naturalised, invasive

Harrisia
Genus Harrisia:
 Harrisia balansae (K.Schum.) N.P.Taylor & Zappi, accepted as Harrisia bonplandii (Pfeiff.) Britton & Rose, not indigenous, naturalised, invasive
 Harrisia bonplandii (Pfeiff.) Britton & Rose, not indigenous, naturalised, invasive
 Harrisia martinii (Labour.) Britton, not indigenous, naturalised, invasive
 Harrisia pomanensis (F.A.C.Weber) Britton & Rose, not indigenous, naturalised, invasive
 Harrisia tortuosa (J.Forbes ex Otto & A.Dietr.) Britton & Rose, not indigenous, naturalised, invasive

Hylocereus
Genus Hylocereus:
 Hylocereus undatus (Haw.) Britton & Rose, not indigenous, naturalised, invasive

Myrtillocactus
Genus Myrtillocactus:
 Myrtillocactus geometrizans Console, not indigenous, naturalised, invasive

Nopalea
Genus Nopalea:
 Nopalea cochenillifera (L.) Salm-Dyck, accepted as Opuntia cochenillifera (L.) Mill. not indigenous, cultivated, naturalised, invasive

Opuntia
Genus Opuntia:
 Opuntia aurantiaca Lindl. not indigenous, naturalised, invasive
 Opuntia dillenii (Ker Gawl.) Haw. accepted as Opuntia stricta (Haw.) Haw. not indigenous, naturalised
 Opuntia elata Salm-Dyck [1], not indigenous, naturalised, invasive
 Opuntia engelmannii Salm-Dyck ex Engelm. not indigenous, naturalised, invasive
 Opuntia exaltata A.Berger, accepted as Austrocylindropuntia subulata (Muehlenpf.) Backeb. not indigenous, naturalised
 Opuntia ficus-indica (L.) Mill. not indigenous, cultivated, naturalised, invasive
 Opuntia humifusa (Raf.) Raf. not indigenous, naturalised, invasive
 Opuntia imbricata (Haw.) DC. accepted as Cylindropuntia imbricata (Haw.) F.M.Knuth, not indigenous, naturalised
 Opuntia leptocaulis DC. accepted as Cylindropuntia leptocaulis (DC.) F.M.Knuth, not indigenous, naturalised
 Opuntia leucotricha DC. not indigenous, naturalised, invasive
 Opuntia lindheimeri Engelm. accepted as Opuntia engelmannii Salm-Dyck ex Engelm. not indigenous, naturalised
 Opuntia microdasys (Lehm.) Pfeiff. not indigenous, naturalised, invasive
 Opuntia monacantha Haw. not indigenous, cultivated, naturalised, invasive
 Opuntia pubescens J.C.Wendl. ex Pfeiff. not indigenous, naturalised, invasive
 Opuntia pumila Rose, accepted as Opuntia pubescens J.C.Wendl. ex Pfeiff.
 Opuntia robusta H.Wendl. ex Pfeiff. not indigenous, naturalised, invasive
 Opuntia rosea DC. accepted as Cylindropuntia imbricata (Haw.) F.M.Knuth, not indigenous, naturalised, invasive
 Opuntia salmiana J.Parm. ex Pfeiff. not indigenous, naturalised, invasive
 Opuntia spinulifera Salm-Dyck, not indigenous, cultivated, naturalised, invasive
 Opuntia stricta (Haw.) Haw. not indigenous, naturalised, invasive
 Opuntia stricta (Haw.) Haw. var. dillenii (Ker Gawl.) L.D.Benson, not indigenous, naturalised, invasive
 Opuntia stricta (Haw.) Haw. var. stricta,  not indigenous, naturalised, invasive
 Opuntia tomentosa Salm-Dyck, not indigenous, naturalised, invasive

Peniocereus
Genus Peniocereus:
 Peniocereus serpentinus (Lag. & Rodr.) N.P.Taylor, not indigenous, naturalised, invasive

Pereskia
Genus Pereskia:
 Pereskia aculeata Mill. not indigenous, naturalised, invasive

Rhipsalis
Genus Rhipsalis:
 Rhipsalis baccifera (Sol.) Stearn, indigenous
 Rhipsalis baccifera (Sol.) Stearn subsp. mauritiana (DC.) Barthlott, indigenous

Stenocereus
Genus Stenocereus:
 Stenocereus pruinosus (Otto ex Pfeiff.) Buxb. not indigenous, cultivated, naturalised

Tephrocactus
Genus Tephrocactus:
 Tephrocactus articulatus (Pfeiff.) Backeb. not indigenous, naturalised, invasive

Trichocereus
Genus Trichocereus:
 Trichocereus macrogonus (Salm-Dyck) Riccob. var. pachanoi (Britton & Rose) Albesiano & R.Kiesling, not indigenous, cultivated, naturalised, invasive

Caryophyllaceae
Family: Caryophyllaceae,

Agrostemma
Genus Agrostemma:
 Agrostemma githago L. subsp. githago, not indigenous, naturalised

Arenaria
Genus Arenaria:
 Arenaria diffusa Elliott, not indigenous, naturalised
 Arenaria fendleri A.Gray, not indigenous, naturalised

Cerastium
Genus Cerastium:
 Cerastium arabidis E.Mey. ex Fenzl, indigenous
 Cerastium capense Sond. indigenous
 Cerastium dichotomum L. endemic
 Cerastium fontanum Baumg. not indigenous, naturalised, invasive
 Cerastium fontanum Baumg. subsp. vulgare (Hartm.) Greuter & Burdet, not indigenous, naturalised, invasive
 Cerastium glomeratum Thuill. indigenous
 Cerastium indicum Wight & Arn. indigenous

Corrigiola
Genus Corrigiola:
 Corrigiola capensis Willd. indigenous
 Corrigiola capensis Willd. subsp. capensis, endemic
 Corrigiola litoralis L. indigenous
 Corrigiola litoralis L. subsp. litoralis var. litoralis, indigenous
 Corrigiola litoralis L. subsp. litoralis var. perennans, indigenous

Dianthus
Genus Dianthus:
 Dianthus albens Aiton, endemic
 Dianthus basuticus Burtt Davy, indigenous
 Dianthus basuticus Burtt Davy subsp. basuticus var. basuticus, indigenous
 Dianthus basuticus Burtt Davy subsp. basuticus var. grandiflorus, indigenous
 Dianthus basuticus Burtt Davy subsp. fourcadei S.S.Hooper, endemic
 Dianthus bolusii Burtt Davy, endemic
 Dianthus burchellii Ser. indigenous
 Dianthus caespitosus Thunb. indigenous
 Dianthus caespitosus Thunb. subsp. caespitosus, endemic
 Dianthus caespitosus Thunb. subsp. pectinatus (E.Mey. ex Sond.) S.S.Hooper, endemic
 Dianthus crenatus Thunb. endemic
 Dianthus holopetalus Turcz. endemic
 Dianthus kamisbergensis Sond. endemic
 Dianthus laingsburgensis S.S.Hooper, endemic
 Dianthus micropetalus Ser. indigenous
 Dianthus mooiensis F.N.Williams, indigenous
 Dianthus mooiensis F.N.Williams subsp. kirkii (Burtt Davy) S.S.Hooper, indigenous
 Dianthus mooiensis F.N.Williams subsp. mooiensis var. dentatus, endemic
 Dianthus mooiensis F.N.Williams subsp. mooiensis var. mooiensis, endemic
 Dianthus namaensis Schinz, indigenous
 Dianthus namaensis Schinz var. dinteri (Schinz) S.S.Hooper, indigenous
 Dianthus namaensis Schinz var. junceus (Burtt Davy) S.S.Hooper, endemic
 Dianthus namaensis Schinz var. namaensis, indigenous
 Dianthus thunbergii S.S.Hooper, indigenous
 Dianthus thunbergii S.S.Hooper forma maritimus S.S.Hooper, endemic
 Dianthus thunbergii S.S.Hooper forma thunbergii, endemic
 Dianthus transvaalensis Burtt Davy, indigenous
 Dianthus zeyheri Sond. indigenous
 Dianthus zeyheri Sond. subsp. natalensis S.S.Hooper, indigenous
 Dianthus zeyheri Sond. subsp. zeyheri, endemic

Drymaria
Genus Drymaria:
 Drymaria cordata (L.) Willd. ex Roem. & Schult. not indigenous, naturalised, invasive
 Drymaria cordata (L.) Willd. ex Roem. & Schult. subsp. diandra (Blume) J.A.Duke, not indigenous, naturalised, invasive

Herniaria
Genus Herniaria:
 Herniaria capensis Bartl. endemic
 Herniaria erckertii Herm. indigenous
 Herniaria erckertii Herm. subsp. erckertii, indigenous
 Herniaria erckertii Herm. subsp. erckertii var. dewetii, accepted as Herniaria erckertii Herm. subsp. erckertii, present
 Herniaria erckertii Herm. subsp. erckertii var. dinteri, accepted as Herniaria erckertii Herm. subsp. erckertii, present
 Herniaria erckertii Herm. subsp. erckertii var. erckertii, accepted as Herniaria erckertii Herm. subsp. erckertii, present
 Herniaria erckertii Herm. subsp. pulvinata Chaudhri, endemic
 Herniaria grimmii Herm. indigenous
 Herniaria pearsonii Chaudhri, endemic
 Herniaria schlechteri Herm. endemic

Holosteum
Genus Holosteum:
 Holosteum umbellatum L. subsp. umbellatum, not indigenous, naturalised

Krauseola
Genus Krauseola:
 Krauseola mosambicina (Moss) Pax & K.Hoffm. endemic

Moenchia
Genus Moenchia:
 Moenchia erecta (L.) Gaertn. subsp. erecta, not indigenous, naturalised

Paronychia
Genus Paronychia:
 Paronychia brasiliana DC. not indigenous, naturalised
 Paronychia brasiliana DC. var. pubescens Chaudhri, not indigenous, naturalised

Petrorhagia
Genus Petrorhagia:
 Petrorhagia prolifera (L.) Ball & Heywood, not indigenous, naturalised

Pollichia
Genus Pollichia:
 Pollichia campestris Aiton, indigenous

Polycarpaea
Genus Polycarpaea:
 Polycarpaea corymbosa (L.) Lam. var. corymbosa, not indigenous, naturalised
 Polycarpaea eriantha Hochst. ex A.Rich. indigenous
 Polycarpaea eriantha Hochst. ex A.Rich. var. effusa (Oliv.) Turrill, indigenous

Polycarpon
Genus Polycarpon:
 Polycarpon prostratum (Forssk.) Asch. & Schweinf. indigenous
 Polycarpon prostratum (Forssk.) Asch. & Schweinf. var. prostratum, indigenous
 Polycarpon tetraphyllum (L.) L. not indigenous, naturalised
 Polycarpon tetraphyllum (L.) L. var. tetraphyllum, accepted as Polycarpon tetraphyllum (L.) L. not indigenous, naturalised

Sagina
Genus Sagina:
 Sagina apetala Ard. not indigenous, naturalised
 Sagina maritima G.Don, not indigenous, naturalised
 Sagina procumbens L. not indigenous, cultivated, naturalised, invasive

Saponaria
Genus Saponaria:
 Saponaria officinalis L. not indigenous, cultivated

Scleranthus
Genus Scleranthus:
 Scleranthus annuus L. not indigenous, naturalised

Silene
Genus Silene:
 Silene aethiopica Burm. indigenous
 Silene aethiopica Burm. subsp. longiflora J.C.Manning & Goldblatt, indigenous
 Silene bellidioides Sond. indigenous
 Silene burchellii Otth, indigenous
 Silene burchellii Otth subsp. modesta J.C.Manning & Goldblatt, indigenous
 Silene burchellii Otth subsp. multiflora J.C.Manning & Goldblatt, indigenous
 Silene burchellii Otth subsp. pilosellifolia (Cham. & Schltdl.) J.C.Manning & Goldblatt, indigenous
 Silene burchellii Otth var. angustifolia Sond. accepted as Silene burchellii Otth subsp. pilosellifolia (Cham. & Schltdl.) J.C.Manning & Goldblatt, present
 Silene burchellii Otth var. burchellii, accepted as Silene burchellii Otth subsp. burchellii, indigenous
 Silene burchellii Otth var. latifolia Sond. accepted as Silene burchellii Otth subsp. modesta J.C.Manning & Goldblatt, present
 Silene burchellii Otth var. pilosellifolia, accepted as Silene burchellii Otth subsp. pilosellifolia (Cham. & Schltdl.) J.C.Manning & Goldblatt, present
 Silene clandestina Jacq. accepted as Silene cretica L. present
 Silene crassifolia L. endemic
 Silene crassifolia L. subsp. crassifolia, endemic
 Silene crassifolia L. subsp. primuliflora (Eckl. & Zeyh.) J.C.Manning & Goldblatt, endemic
 Silene cretica L. not indigenous, naturalised
 Silene dewinteri Bocquet, indigenous
 Silene dioica (L.) Clairv. not indigenous, cultivated, naturalised
 Silene eckloniana Sond. endemic
 Silene gallica L. not indigenous, naturalised
 Silene mundiana Eckl. & Zeyh. endemic
 Silene ornata Aiton, endemic
 Silene pendula L. not indigenous, naturalised
 Silene pilosellifolia Cham. & Schltdl. accepted as Silene burchellii Otth subsp. pilosellifolia (Cham. & Schltdl.) J.C.Manning & Goldblatt, indigenous
 Silene primuliflora Eckl. & Zeyh. indigenous
 Silene primuliflora Eckl. & Zeyh. var. ciliata Fenzl ex Sond. accepted as Silene crassifolia L. subsp. primuliflora (Eckl. & Zeyh.) J.C.Manning & Goldblatt, endemic
 Silene primuliflora Eckl. & Zeyh. var. primuliflora, indigenous
 Silene rigens J.C.Manning & Goldblatt, indigenous
 Silene saldanhensis J.C.Manning & Goldblatt, indigenous
 Silene thunbergiana  Bartl. accepted as Silene thunbergiana Eckl. & Zeyh. ex Sond. indigenous
 Silene thunbergiana  Eckl. & Zeyh. accepted as Silene thunbergiana Eckl. & Zeyh. ex Sond. indigenous
 Silene thunbergiana Eckl. & Zeyh. ex Sond. endemic
 Silene undulata Aiton, indigenous
 Silene undulata Aiton subsp. polyantha J.C.Manning & Goldblatt, indigenous
 Silene undulata Aiton subsp. undulata, indigenous
 Silene vlokii Masson, accepted as Silene primuliflora Eckl. & Zeyh. var. primuliflora, present
 Silene vulgaris (Moench) Garcke, not indigenous, naturalised
 Silene vulgaris (Moench) Garcke subsp. macrocarpa (Marsden) Jones & Turrill, not indigenous, naturalised
 Silene vulgaris (Moench) Garcke subsp. vulgaris, not indigenous, naturalised

Spergula
Genus Spergula:
 Spergula arvensis L. not indigenous, naturalised, invasive

Spergularia
Genus Spergularia:
 Spergularia bocconei (Scheele) Graebn. not indigenous, naturalised
 Spergularia hanoverensis Simon, endemic
 Spergularia media (L.) C.Presl, not indigenous, naturalised
 Spergularia rubra (L.) J.Presl & C.Presl, not indigenous, naturalised

Stellaria
Genus Stellaria:
 Stellaria media (L.) Vill. not indigenous, naturalised
 Stellaria pallida (Dumort.) Pire, indigenous
 Stellaria sennii Chiov. not indigenous, naturalised

Telephium
Genus Telephium:
 Telephium laxiflorum DC. accepted as Corbichonia decumbens (Forssk.) Exell

Vaccaria
Genus Vaccaria:
 Vaccaria hispanica (Mill.) Rauschert var. hispanica, not indigenous, naturalised

Corbichoniaceae
Family: Corbichoniaceae,

Axonotechium
Genus Axonotechium:
 Axonotechium trianthemoides (B.Heyne) Fenzl, accepted as Corbichonia decumbens (Forssk.) Exell

Corbichonia
Genus Corbichonia:
 Corbichonia decumbens (Forssk.) Exell, indigenous
 Corbichonia exellii Sukhor. indigenous

Orygia
Genus Orygia:
 Orygia decumbens Forssk. accepted as Corbichonia decumbens (Forssk.) Exell, indigenous

Didiereaceae
Family: Didiereaceae,

Ceraria
Genus Ceraria:
 Ceraria fruticulosa H.Pearson & Stephens, accepted as Portulacaria fruticulosa (H.Pearson & Stephens) Bruyns & Klak, indigenous
 Ceraria gariepina H.Pearson & Stephens, accepted as Portulacaria namaquensis Sond. indigenous
 Ceraria namaquensis (Sond.) H.Pearson & Stephens, accepted as Portulacaria namaquensis Sond. indigenous
 Ceraria pygmaea (Pillans) G.D.Rowley, accepted as Portulacaria pygmaea Pillans, indigenous
 Ceraria schaeferi Engl. & Schltr. accepted as Portulacaria fruticulosa (H.Pearson & Stephens) Bruyns & Klak

Portulacaria
Genus Portulacaria:
 Portulacaria afra Jacq. indigenous
 Portulacaria armiana Van Jaarsv. indigenous, near endemic
 Portulacaria fruticulosa (H.Pearson & Stephens) Bruyns & Klak, indigenous
 Portulacaria namaquensis Sond. indigenous
 Portulacaria pygmaea Pillans, indigenous

Droseraceae
Family: Droseraceae,

Drosera
Genus Drosera:
 Drosera acaulis L.f. endemic
 Drosera admirabilis Debbert, endemic
 Drosera alba E.Phillips, endemic
 Drosera aliciae Raym.-Hamet, endemic
 Drosera atrostyla Debbert, endemic
 Drosera burkeana Planch. indigenous
 Drosera capensis L. endemic
 Drosera cistiflora L. endemic
 Drosera collinsiae N.E.Br. ex Burtt Davy, indigenous
 Drosera cuneifolia L.f. endemic
 Drosera dielsiana Exell & J.R.Laundon, indigenous
 Drosera ericgreenii A.Fleischm. R.P.Gibson & Rivadia, endemic
 Drosera esterhuyseniae (T.M.Salter) Debbert, endemic
 Drosera glabripes (Harv.) Stein, endemic
 Drosera hilaris Cham. & Schltdl. endemic
 Drosera indica L. indigenous
 Drosera madagascariensis DC. indigenous
 Drosera natalensis Diels, indigenous
 Drosera pauciflora Banks ex DC. endemic
 Drosera ramentacea Burch. ex DC. endemic
 Drosera regia Stephens, endemic
 Drosera rubripetala Debbert, endemic
 Drosera slackii Cheek, endemic
 Drosera trinervia Spreng. indigenous
 Drosera venusta Debbert, endemic

Frankeniaceae
Family: Frankeniaceae,

Frankenia
Genus Frankenia:
 Frankenia densa Pohnert, accepted as Frankenia pulverulenta L.
 Frankenia fruticosa J.C.Manning & Helme, endemic
 Frankenia pulverulenta L. indigenous
 Frankenia repens (P.J.Bergius) Fourc. endemic

Nothria
Genus Nothria:
 Nothria repens P.J.Bergius, accepted as Frankenia repens (P.J.Bergius) Fourc. indigenous

Gisekiaceae
Family: Gisekiaceae,

Gisekia
Genus Gisekia:
 Gisekia africana (Lour.) Kuntze, indigenous
 Gisekia africana (Lour.) Kuntze var. africana, indigenous
 Gisekia africana (Lour.) Kuntze var. cymosa Adamson, accepted as Gisekia africana (Lour.) Kuntze var. decagyna Hauman, present
 Gisekia africana (Lour.) Kuntze var. decagyna Hauman, indigenous
 Gisekia africana (Lour.) Kuntze var. pedunculata (Oliv.) Brenan, indigenous
 Gisekia pharnacioides L. indigenous
 Gisekia pharnacioides L. var. pharnacioides, indigenous

Kewaceae
Family: Kewaceae,

Kewa
Genus Kewa:
 Kewa angrae-pequenae (Friedrich) Christenh. indigenous
 Kewa arenicola (Sond.) Christenh. endemic
 Kewa bowkeriana (Sond.) Christenh. indigenous
 Kewa salsoloides (Burch.) Christenh. indigenous
 Kewa trachysperma (Adamson) Christenh. endemic

Limeaceae
Family: Limeaceae,

Limeum
Genus Limeum:
 Limeum aethiopicum Burm.f. indigenous
 Limeum aethiopicum Burm.f. subsp. aethiopicum var. aethiopicum, accepted as Limeum aethiopicum Burm.f. var. aethiopicum, present
 Limeum aethiopicum Burm.f. subsp. aethiopicum var. fluviale, accepted as Limeum aethiopicum Burm.f. var. fluviale (Eckl. & Zeyh.) Friedrich, present
 Limeum aethiopicum Burm.f. subsp. aethiopicum var. intermedium, accepted as Limeum aethiopicum Burm.f. var. intermedium Friedrich, present
 Limeum aethiopicum Burm.f. subsp. namaense Friedrich var. lanceolatum, accepted as Limeum aethiopicum Burm.f. var. lanceolatum Friedrich, present
 Limeum aethiopicum Burm.f. subsp. namaense Friedrich var. namaense, accepted as Limeum aethiopicum Burm.f. var. glabrum Moq. present
 Limeum aethiopicum Burm.f. var. aethiopicum, endemic
 Limeum aethiopicum Burm.f. var. fluviale (Eckl. & Zeyh.) Friedrich, indigenous
 Limeum aethiopicum Burm.f. var. intermedium Friedrich, endemic
 Limeum aethiopicum Burm.f. var. lanceolatum Friedrich, indigenous
 Limeum africanum L. indigenous
 Limeum africanum L. subsp. africanum, endemic
 Limeum africanum L. subsp. canescens (E.Mey. ex Fenzl) Friedrich, endemic
 Limeum arenicolum G.Schellenb. indigenous
 Limeum argute-carinatum Wawra ex Wawra & Peyr. indigenous
 Limeum argute-carinatum Wawra ex Wawra & Peyr. var. argute-carinatum, indigenous
 Limeum argute-carinatum Wawra ex Wawra & Peyr. var. kwebense (N.E.Br.) Friedrich, indigenous
 Limeum deserticolum Dinter & G.Schellenb. indigenous
 Limeum dinteri G.Schellenb. indigenous
 Limeum fenestratum (Fenzl) Heimerl var. exalatum Friedrich, indigenous
 Limeum fenestratum (Fenzl) Heimerl var. fenestratum, indigenous
 Limeum fenestratum (Fenzl) Heimerl var. frutescens (Dinter) Friedrich, accepted as Limeum fenestratum (Fenzl) Heimerl var. fenestratum
 Limeum humifusum Friedrich, indigenous
 Limeum myosotis H.Walter, indigenous
 Limeum myosotis H.Walter var. confusum Friedrich, indigenous
 Limeum myosotis H.Walter var. myosotis, indigenous
 Limeum pauciflorum Moq. endemic
 Limeum pterocarpum (J.Gay) Heimerl, indigenous
 Limeum pterocarpum (J.Gay) Heimerl var. apterum Friedrich, indigenous
 Limeum pterocarpum (J.Gay) Heimerl var. pterocarpum, indigenous
 Limeum rhombifolium G.Schellenb. indigenous
 Limeum subnudum Friedrich, endemic
 Limeum sulcatum (Klotzsch) Hutch. indigenous
 Limeum sulcatum (Klotzsch) Hutch. var. gracile Friedrich, accepted as Limeum sulcatum (Klotzsch) Hutch. var. sulcatum, present
 Limeum sulcatum (Klotzsch) Hutch. var. robustum Friedrich, accepted as Limeum sulcatum (Klotzsch) Hutch. var. sulcatum, present
 Limeum sulcatum (Klotzsch) Hutch. var. scabridum (Klotzsch) Friedrich, indigenous
 Limeum sulcatum (Klotzsch) Hutch. var. sulcatum, indigenous
 Limeum telephioides E.Mey. ex Fenzl, indigenous
 Limeum telephioides E.Mey. ex Fenzl var. schlechteri (G.Schellenb.) Friedrich, endemic
 Limeum telephioides E.Mey. ex Fenzl var. telephioides, endemic
 Limeum viscosum (J.Gay) Fenzl, indigenous
 Limeum viscosum (J.Gay) Fenzl subsp. nummulifolium (H.Walter) Friedrich, indigenous
 Limeum viscosum (J.Gay) Fenzl subsp. transvaalense Friedrich, endemic
 Limeum viscosum (J.Gay) Fenzl subsp. viscosum var. dubium, indigenous
 Limeum viscosum (J.Gay) Fenzl subsp. viscosum var. glomeratum, indigenous
 Limeum viscosum (J.Gay) Fenzl subsp. viscosum var. kraussii, indigenous
 Limeum viscosum (J.Gay) Fenzl subsp. viscosum var. macrocarpum, indigenous
 Limeum viscosum (J.Gay) Fenzl subsp. viscosum var. viscosum, indigenous

Lophiocarpaceae
Family: Lophiocarpaceae,

Lophiocarpus
Genus Lophiocarpus:
 Lophiocarpus latifolius Nowicke, indigenous
 Lophiocarpus polystachyus Turcz. indigenous
 Lophiocarpus tenuissimus Hook.f. indigenous

Molluginaceae
Family: Molluginaceae,

Adenogramma
Genus Adenogramma:
 Adenogramma capillaris (Eckl. & Zeyh.) Druce, endemic
 Adenogramma congesta Adamson, endemic
 Adenogramma glomerata (L.f.) Druce, indigenous
 Adenogramma lichtensteiniana (Schult.) Druce, endemic
 Adenogramma littoralis Adamson, endemic
 Adenogramma mollugo Rchb.f. endemic
 Adenogramma natans J.C.Manning & Goldblatt, endemic
 Adenogramma physocalyx Fenzl, endemic
 Adenogramma rigida (Bartl.) Sond. endemic
 Adenogramma sylvatica (Eckl. & Zeyh.) Fenzl, endemic
 Adenogramma teretifolia (Thunb.) Adamson, endemic

Coelanthum
Genus Coelanthum:
 Coelanthum grandiflorum E.Mey. ex Fenzl, indigenous
 Coelanthum semiquinquefidum (Hook.f.) Druce, endemic
 Coelanthum verticillatum Adamson, endemic

Glinus
Genus Glinus:
 Glinus bainesii (Oliv.) Pax, indigenous
 Glinus lotoides L. indigenous
 Glinus lotoides L. var. lotoides, not indigenous, naturalised
 Glinus lotoides L. var. virens Fenzl, indigenous
 Glinus oppositifolius (L.) Aug.DC. indigenous
 Glinus oppositifolius (L.) Aug.DC. var. oppositifolius, indigenous
 Glinus trianthemoides B.Heyne, accepted as Corbichonia decumbens (Forssk.) Exell

Hypertelis
Genus Hypertelis:
 Hypertelis angrae-pequenae Friedrich, accepted as Kewa angrae-pequenae (Friedrich) Christenh. indigenous
 Hypertelis arenicola Sond. accepted as Kewa arenicola (Sond.) Christenh. endemic
 Hypertelis bowkeriana Sond. accepted as Kewa bowkeriana (Sond.) Christenh. indigenous
 Hypertelis caespitosa Friedrich, accepted as Kewa caespitosa (Friedrich) Christenh. indigenous
 Hypertelis cerviana (L.) Thulin, indigenous
 Hypertelis longifolia Gand. accepted as Pharnaceum lineare L.f. indigenous
 Hypertelis salsoloides (Burch.) Adamson, accepted as Kewa salsoloides (Burch.) Christenh. indigenous
 Hypertelis spergulacea E.Mey. ex Fenzl, indigenous
 Hypertelis trachysperma Adamson, accepted as Kewa trachysperma (Adamson) Christenh. endemic
 Hypertelis umbellata (Forssk.) Thulin, indigenous
 Hypertelis verrucosa (Eckl. & Zeyh.) Fenzl, accepted as Kewa salsoloides (Burch.) Christenh. indigenous

Mollugo
Genus Mollugo:
 Mollugo cerviana (L.) Ser. ex DC. accepted as Hypertelis cerviana (L.) Thulin, indigenous
 Mollugo cerviana (L.) Ser. ex DC. var. spathulifolia Fenzl, accepted as Hypertelis umbellata (Forssk.) Thulin, indigenous
 Mollugo namaquensis Bolus, accepted as Pharnaceum namaquense (Bolus ex Schltr.) Thulin, endemic
 Mollugo nudicaulis Lam. accepted as Paramollugo nudicaulis (Lam.) Thulin, indigenous
 Mollugo pusilla (Schltr.) Adamson, accepted as Pharnaceum pusillum Schltr. indigenous
 Mollugo spathulifolia (Fenzl) Dinter, accepted as Hypertelis umbellata (Forssk.) Thulin, indigenous
 Mollugo tenella Bolus, accepted as Pharnaceum subtile E.Mey. indigenous
 Mollugo umbellata (Forssk.) Ser. accepted as Hypertelis umbellata (Forssk.) Thulin, indigenous

Paramollugo
Genus Paramollugo:
 Paramollugo nudicaulis (Lam.) Thulin, indigenous

Pharnaceum
Genus Pharnaceum:
 Pharnaceum albens L.f. indigenous
 Pharnaceum alpinum Adamson, indigenous
 Pharnaceum aurantium (DC.) Druce, indigenous
 Pharnaceum brevicaule (DC.) Bartl. indigenous
 Pharnaceum cervianum L. accepted as Hypertelis cerviana (L.) Thulin, indigenous
 Pharnaceum ciliare Adamson, endemic
 Pharnaceum confertum (DC.) Eckl. & Zeyh. indigenous
 Pharnaceum confertum (DC.) Eckl. & Zeyh. var. brachyphyllum Adamson, indigenous
 Pharnaceum confertum (DC.) Eckl. & Zeyh. var. confertum, indigenous
 Pharnaceum cordifolium L. endemic
 Pharnaceum croceum E.Mey. ex Fenzl, indigenous
 Pharnaceum detonsum Fenzl, indigenous
 Pharnaceum dichotomum L.f. indigenous
 Pharnaceum elongatum (DC.) Adamson, endemic
 Pharnaceum exiguum Adamson, indigenous
 Pharnaceum fluviale Eckl. & Zeyh. endemic
 Pharnaceum incanum L. endemic
 Pharnaceum lanatum Bartl. endemic
 Pharnaceum lanuginosum J.C.Manning & Goldblatt, endemic
 Pharnaceum lineare L.f. endemic
 Pharnaceum microphyllum L.f. endemic
 Pharnaceum microphyllum L.f. var. albens Adamson, accepted as Pharnaceum lanuginosum J.C.Manning & Goldblatt, present
 Pharnaceum microphyllum L.f. var. microphyllum, indigenous
 Pharnaceum namaquense (Bolus ex Schltr.) Thulin, endemic
 Pharnaceum pusillum Schltr. indigenous
 Pharnaceum quadrangulare L.f. accepted as Psammotropha quadrangularis (L.f.) Fenzl var. quadrangularis, present
 Pharnaceum rubens Adamson, endemic
 Pharnaceum scleranthoides Sond. accepted as Suessenguthiella scleranthoides (Sond.) Friedrich, indigenous
 Pharnaceum serpyllifolium L.f. endemic
 Pharnaceum subtile E.Mey. indigenous
 Pharnaceum thunbergii Adamson, endemic
 Pharnaceum trigonum Eckl. & Zeyh. indigenous
 Pharnaceum umbellatum Forssk. accepted as Hypertelis umbellata (Forssk.) Thulin, indigenous
 Pharnaceum verrucosum Eckl. & Zeyh. accepted as Kewa salsoloides (Burch.) Christenh. indigenous
 Pharnaceum viride Adamson, endemic

Polpoda
Genus Polpoda:
 Polpoda capensis C.Presl, endemic
 Polpoda stipulacea (F.M.Leight.) Adamson, endemic

Psammotropha
Genus Psammotropha:
 Psammotropha alternifolia Killick, indigenous
 Psammotropha anguina Compton, endemic
 Psammotropha breviscapa Burtt Davy, accepted as Psammotropha myriantha Sond. indigenous
 Psammotropha diffusa Adamson, endemic
 Psammotropha frigida Schltr. endemic
 Psammotropha marginata (Thunb.) Druce, indigenous
 Psammotropha mucronata (Thunb.) Fenzl, indigenous
 Psammotropha mucronata (Thunb.) Fenzl var. foliosa Adamson, indigenous
 Psammotropha mucronata (Thunb.) Fenzl var. marginata Adamson, indigenous
 Psammotropha mucronata (Thunb.) Fenzl var. mucronata, indigenous
 Psammotropha myriantha Sond. indigenous
 Psammotropha obovata Adamson, indigenous
 Psammotropha obtusa Adamson, indigenous
 Psammotropha quadrangularis (L.f.) Fenzl, endemic
 Psammotropha quadrangularis (L.f.) Fenzl var. calcarata Compton, endemic
 Psammotropha quadrangularis (L.f.) Fenzl var. quadrangularis, endemic
 Psammotropha spicata Adamson, endemic
 Psammotropha stipulacea F.M.Leight. accepted as Polpoda stipulacea (F.M.Leight.) Adamson, indigenous

Suessenguthiella
Genus Suessenguthiella:
 Suessenguthiella caespitosa Friedrich, accepted as Suessenguthiella scleranthoides (Sond.) Friedrich
 Suessenguthiella scleranthoides (Sond.) Friedrich, indigenous

Nyctaginaceae
Family: Nyctaginaceae,

Boerhavia
Genus Boerhavia:
 Boerhavia coccinea Mill. indigenous
 Boerhavia coccinea Mill. var. coccinea, indigenous
 Boerhavia cordobensis Kuntze, not indigenous, naturalised
 Boerhavia diffusa L. var. diffusa, not indigenous, naturalised
 Boerhavia erecta L. not indigenous, naturalised
 Boerhavia hereroensis Heimerl, indigenous
 Boerhavia repens L. indigenous
 Boerhavia repens L. subsp. repens, indigenous

Bougainvillea
Genus Bougainvillea:
 Bougainvillea glabra Choisy, not indigenous, naturalised, invasive

Commicarpus
Genus Commicarpus:
 Commicarpus chinensis (L.) Heimerl, indigenous
 Commicarpus chinensis (L.) Heimerl subsp. natalensis Meikle, indigenous
 Commicarpus decipiens Meikle, indigenous
 Commicarpus helenae (Roem. & Schult.) Meikle, indigenous
 Commicarpus helenae (Roem. & Schult.) Meikle var. helenae, indigenous
 Commicarpus pentandrus (Burch.) Heimerl, indigenous
 Commicarpus pilosus (Heimerl) Meikle, indigenous
 Commicarpus plumbagineus (Cav.) Standl. indigenous
 Commicarpus plumbagineus (Cav.) Standl. var. plumbagineus, indigenous

Mirabilis
Genus Mirabilis:
 Mirabilis jalapa L. not indigenous, naturalised, invasive

Phaeoptilum
Genus Phaeoptilum:
 Phaeoptilum spinosum Radlk. indigenous

Pisonia
Genus Pisonia:
 Pisonia aculeata L. indigenous

Phytolaccaceae
Family: Phytolaccaceae,

Hilleria
Genus Hilleria:
 Hilleria latifolia (Lam.) H.Walter, indigenous

Petiveria
Genus Petiveria:
 Petiveria alliacea L. not indigenous, naturalised, invasive

Phytolacca 
Genus Phytolacca :
 Phytolacca americana L. not indigenous, naturalised, invasive
 Phytolacca dioica L. not indigenous, naturalised, invasive
 Phytolacca dodecandra L'Her. indigenous
 Phytolacca heptandra Retz. indigenous
 Phytolacca octandra L. not indigenous, naturalised, invasive

Rivina
Genus Rivina:
 Rivina humilis L. not indigenous, naturalised, invasive

Plumbaginaceae
Family: Plumbaginaceae,

Afrolimon
Genus Afrolimon:
 Afrolimon amoenum (C.H.Wright) Lincz. accepted as Limonium amoenum (C.H.Wright) R.A.Dyer, endemic
 Afrolimon capense (L.Bolus) Lincz. accepted as Limonium capense (L.Bolus) L.Bolus, endemic
 Afrolimon longifolium (Thunb.) Lincz. accepted as Limonium longifolium (Thunb.) R.A.Dyer, endemic
 Afrolimon namaquanum (L.Bolus) Lincz. accepted as Limonium namaquanum L.Bolus, endemic
 Afrolimon peregrinum (P.J.Bergius) Lincz. accepted as Limonium peregrinum (P.J.Bergius) R.A.Dyer, endemic
 Afrolimon purpuratum (L.) Lincz. accepted as Limonium purpuratum (L.) F.T.Hubb. ex L.H.Bailey, endemic
 Afrolimon teretifolium (L.) Lincz. accepted as Limonium teretifolium L.Bolus, endemic

Dyerophytum
Genus Dyerophytum:
 Dyerophytum africanum (Lam.) Kuntze, indigenous

Limonium
Genus Limonium:
 Limonium acuminatum L.Bolus, endemic
 Limonium amoenum (C.H.Wright) R.A.Dyer, endemic
 Limonium anthericoides (Schltr.) R.A.Dyer, endemic
 Limonium capense (L.Bolus) L.Bolus, endemic
 Limonium decumbens (Boiss.) Kuntze, endemic
 Limonium depauperatum (Boiss.) R.A.Dyer, endemic
 Limonium dregeanum (C.Presl) Kuntze, indigenous
 Limonium equisetinum (Boiss.) R.A.Dyer, endemic
 Limonium kraussianum (Buchinger ex Boiss.) Kuntze, endemic
 Limonium linifolium (L.f.) Kuntze, indigenous
 Limonium linifolium (L.f.) Kuntze var. linifolium, endemic
 Limonium linifolium (L.f.) Kuntze var. maritimum (Eckl. & Zeyh. ex Boiss.) R.A.Dyer, endemic
 Limonium longifolium (Thunb.) R.A.Dyer, endemic
 Limonium membranaceum R.A.Dyer, accepted as Limonium dyeri Lincz.
 Limonium namaquanum L.Bolus, endemic
 Limonium peregrinum (P.J.Bergius) R.A.Dyer, endemic
 Limonium perezii (Stapf) F.T.Hubb. not indigenous; cult, naturalised
 Limonium purpuratum (L.) F.T.Hubb. ex L.H.Bailey, endemic
 Limonium scabrum (Thunb.) Kuntze, indigenous
 Limonium scabrum (Thunb.) Kuntze var. avenaceum (C.H.Wright) R.A.Dyer, endemic
 Limonium scabrum (Thunb.) Kuntze var. corymbulosum (Boiss.) R.A.Dyer, endemic
 Limonium scabrum (Thunb.) Kuntze var. scabrum, indigenous
 Limonium sinuatum (L.) Mill. not indigenous; cult, naturalised, invasive
 Limonium sinuatum (L.) Mill. subsp. sinuatum, not indigenous; cult, naturalised, invasive
 Limonium teretifolium L.Bolus, endemic

Plumbago
Genus Plumbago:
 Plumbago auriculata Lam. indigenous
 Plumbago tristis Aiton, endemic
 Plumbago zeylanica L. not indigenous, naturalised

Polygonaceae
Family: Polygonaceae,

Antigonon
Genus Antigonon:
 Antigonon leptopus Hook. & Arn. not indigenous, naturalised, invasive

Emex
Genus Emex:
 Emex australis Steinh. indigenous
 Emex podocentrum Meisn. accepted as Emex australis Steinh. present

Fagopyrum
Genus Fagopyrum:
 Fagopyrum esculentum Moench, not indigenous, naturalised

Fallopia
Genus Fallopia:
 Fallopia convolvulus (L.) Holub, not indigenous, naturalised
 Fallopia sachalinensis (F.Schmidt) Ronse Decr. accepted as Reynoutria sachalinensis (F.Schmidt) Nakai, not indigenous, naturalised, invasive

Oxygonum
Genus Oxygonum:
 Oxygonum alatum Burch. indigenous
 Oxygonum alatum Burch. var. alatum, indigenous
 Oxygonum delagoense Kuntze, indigenous
 Oxygonum dregeanum Meisn. indigenous
 Oxygonum dregeanum Meisn. subsp. canescens (Sond.) Germish. var. canescens, indigenous
 Oxygonum dregeanum Meisn. subsp. canescens (Sond.) Germish. var. dissectum, endemic
 Oxygonum dregeanum Meisn. subsp. canescens (Sond.) Germish. var. linearifolium, endemic
 Oxygonum dregeanum Meisn. subsp. canescens (Sond.) Germish. var. lobophyllum, indigenous
 Oxygonum dregeanum Meisn. subsp. canescens (Sond.) Germish. var. pilosum, endemic
 Oxygonum dregeanum Meisn. subsp. dregeanum, endemic
 Oxygonum dregeanum Meisn. subsp. lanceolatum Germish. indigenous
 Oxygonum dregeanum Meisn. subsp. streyi Germish. endemic
 Oxygonum dregeanum Meisn. subsp. swazicum (Burtt Davy) Germish. indigenous
 Oxygonum robustum Germish. indigenous
 Oxygonum sinuatum (Hochst. & Steud. ex Meisn.) Dammer, indigenous

Persicaria
Genus Persicaria:
 Persicaria amphibia (L.) Gray, not indigenous, naturalised
 Persicaria attenuata (R.Br.) Sojak subsp. africana K.L.Wilson, accepted as Persicaria madagascariensis (Meisn.) S.Ortiz & Paiva, indigenous
 Persicaria capitata (Buch.-Ham. ex D.Don) H.Gross, not indigenous, naturalised, invasive
 Persicaria decipiens (R.Br.) K.L.Wilson, indigenous
 Persicaria hydropiper (L.) Spach, not indigenous, naturalised
 Persicaria hystricula (J.Schust.) Sojak, indigenous
 Persicaria lapathifolia (L.) Gray, not indigenous, naturalised
 Persicaria madagascariensis (Meisn.) S.Ortiz & Paiva, indigenous
 Persicaria meisneriana (Cham. & Schltdl.) M.Gomez, indigenous
 Persicaria nepalensis (Meisn.) H.Gross, not indigenous, naturalised
 Persicaria senegalensis (Meisn.) Sojak, indigenous
 Persicaria senegalensis (Meisn.) Sojak forma albotomentosa (R.A.Graham) K.L.Wilson, indigenous
 Persicaria senegalensis (Meisn.) Sojak forma senegalensis, indigenous
 Persicaria serrulata (Lag.) Webb & Moq. accepted as Persicaria decipiens (R.Br.) K.L.Wilson, present
 Persicaria wallichii Greuter & Burdet, not indigenous, cultivated, naturalised

Polygonum
Genus Polygonum:
 Polygonum aviculare L. not indigenous, naturalised
 Polygonum bellardii All. not indigenous, naturalised
 Polygonum hystriculum J.Schust. accepted as Persicaria hystricula (J.Schust.) Sojak, present
 Polygonum kitaibelianum Sadler, accepted as Polygonum bellardii All. not indigenous, naturalised
 Polygonum maritimum L. not indigenous, naturalised
 Polygonum meisnerianum Cham. & Schltdl. accepted as Persicaria meisneriana (Cham. & Schltdl.) M.Gomez, present
 Polygonum plebeium R.Br. indigenous
 Polygonum poiretii Meisn. var. madagascariensis Meisn. accepted as Persicaria madagascariensis (Meisn.) S.Ortiz & Paiva, indigenous
 Polygonum snijmaniae S.Ortiz, endemic
 Polygonum undulatum (L.) P.J.Bergius, endemic

Reynoutria
Genus Reynoutria:
 Reynoutria sachalinensis (F.Schmidt) Nakai, not indigenous, naturalised, invasive

Rumex
Genus Rumex:
 Rumex acetosella L. subsp. angiocarpus (Murb.) Murb. not indigenous, naturalised
 Rumex bequaertii De Wild. indigenous
 Rumex brownii Campd. not indigenous, naturalised
 Rumex conglomeratus Murb. indigenous
 Rumex cordatus Poir. indigenous
 Rumex crispus L. not indigenous, naturalised, invasive
 Rumex dregeanus Meisn. indigenous
 Rumex dregeanus Meisn. subsp. dregeanus, endemic
 Rumex dregeanus Meisn. subsp. montanus B.L.Burtt, indigenous
 Rumex lanceolatus Thunb. indigenous
 Rumex lativalvis Meisn. endemic
 Rumex nepalensis Spreng. not indigenous, naturalised
 Rumex obtusifolius L. subsp. obtusifolius, indigenous
 Rumex pulcher L. not indigenous, naturalised
 Rumex pulcher L. subsp. divaricatus (L.) Murb. not indigenous, naturalised
 Rumex rhodesius Rech.f. indigenous
 Rumex sagittatus Thunb. indigenous
 Rumex spathulatus Thunb. endemic
 Rumex steudelii Hochst. ex A.Rich. indigenous
 Rumex usambarensis (Dammer) Dammer, not indigenous, naturalised, invasive
 Rumex woodii N.E.Br. indigenous

Triplaris
Genus Triplaris:
 Triplaris americana L. not indigenous, naturalised, invasive

Portulacaceae
Family: Portulacaceae,

Calandrinia
Genus Calandrinia:
 Calandrinia ciliata (Ruiz & Pav.) DC. not indigenous, naturalised

Claytonia
Genus Claytonia:
 Claytonia portulacaria (L.) L. accepted as Portulacaria afra Jacq. indigenous

Portulaca
Genus Portulaca:
 Portulaca collina Dinter, indigenous
 Portulaca decumbens (Forssk.) Vahl, accepted as Corbichonia decumbens (Forssk.) Exell, indigenous
 Portulaca foliosa Ker Gawl. indigenous
 Portulaca fruticosa Thunb. accepted as Portulacaria afra Jacq. indigenous
 Portulaca grandiflora Hook. endemic
 Portulaca hereroensis Schinz, indigenous
 Portulaca kermesina N.E.Br. indigenous
 Portulaca oleracea L. not indigenous, naturalised
 Portulaca pilosa L. indigenous
 Portulaca quadrifida L. indigenous
 Portulaca rhodesiana R.A.Dyer & E.A.Bruce, indigenous
 Portulaca trianthemoides Bremek. endemic

Tamaricaceae
Family: Tamaricaceae,

Tamarix
Genus Tamarix:
 Tamarix angolensis Nied. accepted as Tamarix usneoides E.Mey. ex Bunge
 Tamarix chinensis Lour. not indigenous, naturalised, invasive
 Tamarix ramosissima Ledeb. not indigenous, naturalised, invasive
 Tamarix usneoides E.Mey. ex Bunge, indigenous

References

South African plant biodiversity lists
Caryophyllales